Payam Parsa (born July 22, 2002) is an Iranian football goalkeeper who currently plays for Sanat Naft Abadan in the Persian Gulf Pro League.

Club career

Sanat Naft
He made his debut for Sanat Naft in first fixtures of 2020–21 Persian Gulf Pro League against Paykan.

References

Living people
2002 births
People from Abadan, Iran
Association football goalkeepers
Iranian footballers
Sanat Naft Abadan F.C. players
Persian Gulf Pro League players
Sportspeople from Khuzestan province